Germanus, called "patricius" (Greek: πατρίκιος), was a leading member of the Byzantine Senate during the reign of Maurice.

Family

Other than a wife called Leontia by Theophanes the Confessor, there is no named relative of Germanus. His name has led to a possible identification with a similarly named son of Germanus (d. 550) and Matasuntha. But said son has also been identified with Germanus, a son-in-law of Tiberius II Constantine and Ino Anastasia. The common name "Germanus" may hint to these figures being related to each other but there is insufficient evidence for identifications.

Under Maurice

In November 601 or more likely, in February 602, an unnamed daughter of Germanus married Theodosius, the eldest son of Maurice and Constantina. The marriage was recorded by Theophylact Simocatta, Theophanes the Confessor, the Chronicon Paschale, Joannes Zonaras and Georgios Kedrenos.

On 2 February 602, Theophylact records Germanus rescuing the life of Theodosius from a rioting mob in Constantinople, angry over a food shortage. Later that year, Germanus and Theodosius went hunting to Callicrateia, a brief distance from Constantinople. There they received correspondence from the rebellious army of Thrace. The rebels demanded the deposition of Maurice and offered their support to elevate either Theodosius or Germanus to the throne.

Germanus was soon accused of treason by Maurice. The emperor suspected him of being responsible for the ongoing revolt. Besides the incriminating letter, there was another act pointing to the rebels being allied to Germanus. They were reportedly seizing all horses outside Constantinople, but had left Germanus' horses alone. Germanus pleaded for his innocence in vain. Theodosius convinced his father-in-law to flee before facing the wrath of Maurice.

Germanus and his bodyguard sought sanctuary, first in the church to the Theotokos created by Cyrus of Panopolis, then in the Hagia Sophia. Maurice send his own guards to capture Germanus and turmoil followed. Germanus considered surrendering but a crowd sympathetic to him convinced him otherwise. They were convinced that Maurice was intending to execute Germanus.

Under Phocas

In late November, 602, Maurice fled Constantinople to escape the advancing rebels. Germanus took his chance to claim the throne. He counted on the support of the Green faction in the Hippodrome of Constantinople. He had miscalculated as the Greens firmly rejected him. The would-be-emperor immediately turned to support Phocas, the leader of the rebels. According to Theophylact, Phocas had briefly considered elevating Germanus to the throne, but instead seized the throne for himself.

A rumor of the time suggested that Germanus had managed to save the life of Theodosius by bribing Phocas' men. Theophylact dismisses any truth to the rumor. In any case, Phocas did not trust Germanus. The Chronicon mentions Germanus becoming a priest in 603. Theophanes considers this to be a direct decision by Phocas, who had discovered Germanus conspiring against him.

If Phocas believed that he was finished with Germanus, he was wrong. Theophanes records that Constantina maintained contact with Germanus and that both were conspiring against Phocas. Their messages were entrusted to Petronia, a maidservant under Constantina. Petronia proved disloyal and reported the conspiracy to Phocas. Constantina was arrested and placed in the custody of Theopemptus, prefect of Constantinople. Her interrogation included torture and she was forced to give the name of her fellow conspirators.

Constantina and all three of her daughters were executed at Chalcedon. Germanus and his unnamed daughter were also executed on the island of Prote. The daughter had been the widow of Theodosius. Theophanes places the deaths in 605/606 but the exact date is in doubt. The Chronicon Paschale reports that all six were decapitated.

Sources

References 

600s deaths
Justinian dynasty
7th-century Byzantine people
Executed Byzantine people
People executed by decapitation
Year of birth unknown
7th-century executions by the Byzantine Empire